Jane D. Marsching is an interdisciplinary digital artist focusing on issues of climate change and environmentalism. She earned a BA from Hampshire College and an MFA in photography from the School of the Visual Arts. She is Professor of Studio Foundation at MassArt. Her work has been exhibited nationally and internationally at major museums including the ICA Boston and MassMoca.

Art 
Marsching's climate change related work began using the National Oceanic Atmospheric Administration's North Pole webcam. She created a time-lapse film of footage from the webcam with sound by Victor McSurely. She created interactive works using data and relying heavily on research. Multiple works including the North Pole Webcam make up the interdisciplinary and collaborative project, Arctic Listening Post (2005-2009). The project was awarded a Creative Capital Grant in Emerging Fields in 2006.  Her works have been influenced by the writing of Henry David Thoreau. Her projects extend for a number of years and include collaboration with scientists, choreographers, and software engineers. The resulting projects including, Field Station Concordia, are interactive, participatory and utilize networks, communities and the local landscape for their creation. She, Catherine D'Ignazio and Andi Sutton co-founded the Art&Activism group Platform 2. In 2020, Marsching conducted ink-foraging workshops at Fruitlands Museum in Harvard, Massachusetts.

Awards
Creative Capital 
LEF Foundation
James and Audrey Foster Prize Finalist, ICA Boston, 2006

References

External links
http://www.platform2.info/
http://www.plotformplot.org/
http://www.janemarsching.com/

Year of birth missing (living people)
Living people
American digital artists
Women digital artists
Massachusetts College of Art and Design faculty
School of Visual Arts alumni
Hampshire College alumni
Interdisciplinary artists
21st-century American women artists